Carlos José Tamara Paternina (born 15 March 1983) is a Colombian former professional boxer who competed from 2005 to 2013. He held the IBF light flyweight title in 2010 and previously challenged for the WBO flyweight title in 2008. As an amateur, he competed at the 2004 Summer Olympics and won a silver medal at the 2003 Pan American Games.

Amateur career

Olympic results
Tamara competed for Colombia at the 2004 Olympic Games in Athens. He was defeated in the second round by Italy's Alfonso Pinto in the Light Flyweight (48 kg) division. Results were:

Defeated Redouane Bouchtouk (Morocco) 48-0
Lost to Alfonso Pinto (Italy) 35-49

Professional career

World Title
Carlos defeated American Brian Viloria with 1:45 left in the 12th and final round of a title fight on January 23, 2010 in Manila, Philippines.

References

External links
 
 

1983 births
Olympic boxers of Colombia
Living people
Boxers at the 2003 Pan American Games
Boxers at the 2004 Summer Olympics
International Boxing Federation champions
Colombian male boxers
Pan American Games silver medalists for Colombia
Pan American Games medalists in boxing
People from Sincelejo
Light-flyweight boxers
Medalists at the 2003 Pan American Games
20th-century Colombian people
21st-century Colombian people